is a Japanese period manga series, based on the novel Ichi-Mu-An Fūryūki by Keiichiro Ryu and illustrated by Tetsuo Hara. It was serialized in Shueisha's Weekly Shōnen Jump from March 1990 to August 1993. The story serves as a fictionalized account of the life of Keiji Maeda. Hana no Keiji is one of best-selling Weekly Shōnen Jump manga series of all time, with over 17 million copies in circulation. An English adaptation was published in Raijin Comics under the shortened title Keiji.

Characters

A tall military commander who is said to be the best "kabukimono" on Earth. Although the son of Takigawa Kazumasu, he was adopted by Maeda Toshihisa, Toshiie's older brother. Despite this, Toshiie dislikes him. A free-spirited warrior who lives by his own will. His beloved horse is named .

A pint-sized shinobi who formerly served Yotsui Shume. Even though his younger brother was trampled to death by Keiji and his horse Matsukaze, he becomes fascinated with Keiji to the point of infatuation and becomes his follower.

A character original to the manga. A resident from the Village of Seven Faces who has the face of an oni. He fought against Keiji at first in order to rescue his adoptive daughter Ofū, but comes to admire Keiji's character and eventually becomes one of his followers. He possesses enormous strength, as well as the ability to read minds.

Media

Manga
Hana no Keiji is based on the novel  by Keiichiro Ryu and illustrated by Tetsuo Hara. It was originally published as a one-shot manga in issue #50 of 1989 of the shōnen manga anthology Weekly Shōnen Jump, released on November 27. The regular serialization started in 1990 in Weekly Shōnen Jump from issue #13, dated March 12, and finished in 1993, in issue #33 dated August 2. 18 tankōbon volumes were published by Shueisha under the "Jump Comics" imprint between July 10, 1990, and November 4, 1993. The series was republished in a 10-volume bunkōban edition by Shueisha, published between March 18 and November 18, 1999. A 15-volume kanzenban edition by Tokuma Shoten was released from September 30, 2004, to October 29, 2005.

In 2003, an English version of the manga was serialized in the short-lived anthology Raijin Comics published by the now-defunct Gutsoon! Entertainment, where the first 26 chapters were printed, until Raijin Comics ceased its publication in 2004. No collected volumes were published.

Spin-offs
In 2008, a Keiji spin-off titled Gifū Dōdō!! Naoe Kanetsugu -Maeda Keiji Tsuki-gatari-, written by Tetsuo Hara and Nobuhiko Horie and illustrated by Yuji Takemura, began serialization in Shinchosha's Weekly Comic Bunch on November 7. The series was stopped on August 27, 2010, after Weekly Comic Bunch ended its publication. Nine volumes were published.

In 2010, a sequel entitled Gifū Dōdō!! Naoe Kanetsugu -Maeda Keiji Sake-gatari started in the brand new magazine Monthly Comic Zenon by Tokuma Shoten on October 25, 2010. The manga finished on January 27, 2014, with ten volumes being published.

A final arc entitled Gifū Dōdō!! Naoe Kanetsugu -Maeda Keiji Hana-gatari, written by Hara and Horie and illustrated by Masato Deguchi, was published in the May issue of Monthly Comic Zenon on March 24, 2014. The series finished on October 25, 2018. As of November 20, 2018, fourteen volumes have been published.

Related media
Shueisha released an audiobook version of Hana no Keiji in December 1993. The audiobook stars Akio Ōtsuka as the voice of Keiji Maeda.

A Hana no Keiji video game was developed by TOSE and published by Yojigen for the Super Famicom on November 18, 1994. It is a competitive weapon-based fighting game which adapts the storyline of the manga from the beginning and up until the Fūma Kotarō arc.

Gifū Dōdō!! Naoe Kanetsugu -Maeda Keiji Sake-gatari has been adapted into an anime television series aired on TV Tokyo on July 2, 2013, entitled Gifū Dōdō!! Kanetsugu to Keiji, and was streamed on Crunchyroll. The 25-episodes series aired until December 17, 2013.

References

External links
 Gifū Dōdō!! official website 
 

1990 manga
1994 video games
Anime series based on manga
Historical anime and manga
Japan-exclusive video games
Samurai in anime and manga
Shinchosha manga
Shōnen manga
Shueisha franchises
Shueisha manga
Studio Deen
Super Nintendo Entertainment System games
Super Nintendo Entertainment System-only games
Tokuma Shoten manga
Tose (company) games
TV Tokyo original programming
Yojigen games
Fighting games
Video games based on anime and manga
Video games developed in Japan